The Proto-Altaic language is a hypothetical extinct language that has been proposed as the common ancestor of the disputed Altaic languages.

In the 18th century, some similarities between the Turkic, Mongolian, and Tungusic languages led to the conjecture that they would be a single language family with a common ancestral language.  Starting in the 19th century, some linguists proposed to include also the Japonic and/or Koreanic languages as well as the Ainu language, forming what would later be called the "Macro-Altaic family" (the original one being then dubbed "Micro-Altaic"). Around the same time others proposed to include the Uralic languages in a Ural-Altaic family.

Versions of the Altaic family hypothesis were widely accepted until the 1960s, and it is still listed in many encyclopedias and handbooks.  However, in recent decades, the proposal has received substantial criticisms and has been rejected by many comparative linguists.

Nevertheless, "Altaicists" (supporters of the theory of a common origin for the Altaic languages) such as Václav Blažek and Sergei Starostin have endeavored to reconstruct "Proto-Altaic," the hypothetical common ancestral language of the family.

Some Altaicists have proposed that the original area where Proto-(Macro-)Altaic would have been spoken was a relatively small area comprising present-day North Korea, Southern Manchuria, and Southeastern Mongolia. The date for its split into the major recognized families was estimated at around 5,000 BC or 6,000 BC. This would make Altaic a language family about as old as Indo-European (4,000 to 7,000 BC according to several hypotheses) but considerably younger than Afroasiatic (c. 10,000 BC or 11,000 to 16,000 BC according to different sources).

Reconstruction
, the most comprehensive attempt at reconstructing a Proto-(Macro)-Altaic language is the 2003 Etymological Dictionary of the Altaic Languages by Starostin, Dybo, and Mudrak, which was summarized in 2006 by Blažek.

Reconstructed phonology
Based on the proposed correspondences listed below, the following phoneme inventory (in IPA notation) has been reconstructed for the hypothetical Proto(-Macro)-Altaic language.

Consonants

1 This phoneme only occurred at the beginnings of words.
2 These phonemes only occurred in the interior of words.

Vowels

In any case, however, they only occurred in the first (and sometimes only) syllable of any word.

Every vowel occurred in long and short versions which were different phonemes in the first syllable. Starostin et al. (2003) treat length together with pitch as a prosodic feature.

Prosody
As reconstructed by Starostin et al. (2003), Proto-Altaic was a pitch accent or tone language; at least the first and probably every syllable could have a high or a low pitch.

Sound correspondences
If a Proto(-Macro)-Altaic language really existed, it should be possible to reconstruct regular sound correspondences between that protolanguage and its descendants; such correspondences would make it possible to distinguish cognates from loanwords (in many cases). Such attempts have repeatedly been made. The latest version is reproduced here, taken from Blažek's (2006) summary of the newest Altaic etymological dictionary (Starostin et al. 2003) and transcribed into the IPA.

When a Proto-Altaic phoneme developed differently depending on its position in a word (beginning, interior, or end), the special case (or all cases) is marked with a hyphen; for example, Proto-Altaic  disappears (marked "0") or becomes  at the beginning of a Turkic word and becomes  elsewhere in a Turkic word.

Consonants
Only single consonants are considered here. In the middle of words, clusters of two consonants were allowed in Proto-Altaic as reconstructed by Starostin et al. (2003); the correspondence table of these clusters spans almost seven pages in their book (83–89), and most clusters are only found in one or a few of the reconstructed roots.

1 The Khalaj language has  instead. (It also retains a number of other archaisms.) However, it has also added  in front of words for which no initial consonant (except in some cases , as expected) can be reconstructed for Proto-Altaic; therefore, and because it would make them dependent on whether Khalaj happens to have preserved any given root, Starostin et al.
2 The Monguor language has  here instead (Kaiser & Shevoroshkin 1988); it is therefore possible that Proto-Mongolian also had  which then became  (and then usually disappeared) in all descendants except Monguor. Tabgač and Kitan, two extinct Para-Mongolic languages not considered by Starostin et al. (2003), even preserve  in these places (Blažek 2006).
4 Before .
6 This happened "in syllables with original high pitch" (Starostin et al. 2003:135).
13 Before .
14 Starostin et al. (Dybo & Starostin 2008:footnote 50)
15 Before .

Vowels
Vowel harmony is pervasive in the languages attributed to Altaic: most Turkic and Mongolic as well as some Tungusic languages have it, Korean is arguably in the process of losing its traces, and it is controversially hypothesized for Old Japanese. (Vowel harmony is also typical of the neighboring Uralic languages and was often counted among the arguments for the Ural–Altaic hypotheses.) Nevertheless, Starostin et al. (2003) reconstruct Proto-Altaic as lacking vowel harmony. Instead, according to them, vowel harmony originated in each daughter branch as assimilation of the vowel in the first syllable to the vowel in the second syllable (which was usually modified or lost later). "The situation therefore is very close, e.g. to Germanic [see Germanic umlaut] or to the Nakh languages in the Eastern Caucasus, where the quality of non-initial vowels can now only be recovered on the basis of umlaut processes in the first syllable." (Starostin et al. 2003:91) The table below is taken from Starostin et al. (2003):

1 When preceded by a bilabial consonant.
3 When preceded or followed by a bilabial consonant.
4 When preceded by a fricative.

Prosody
Length and pitch in the first syllable evolved as follows according to Starostin et al. (2003), with the caveat that it is not clear which pitch was high and which was low in Proto-Altaic (Starostin et al. 2003:135). For simplicity of input and display every syllable is symbolized as "a" here:

¹ "Proto-Mongolian has lost all traces of the original prosody except for voicing *p > *b in syllables with original high pitch" (Starostin et al. 2003:135).
² "[...] several secondary metatonic processes happened [...] in Korean, basically in the verb subsystem: all verbs have a strong tendency towards low pitch on the first syllable." (Starostin et al. 2003:135)

Morphological correspondences
Starostin et al. (2003) have reconstructed the following correspondences between the case and number suffixes (or clitics) of the (Macro-)Altaic languages (taken from Blažek, 2006):

/V/ symbolizes an uncertain vowel. Suffixes reconstructed for Proto-Turkic, Proto-Mongolic, Proto-Korean, or Proto-Japonic, but not attested in Old Turkic, Classical Mongolian, Middle Korean, or Old Japanese are marked with asterisks.

This correspondences, however, have been harshly criticized for several reasons: There are significant gaps resulting in the absence of etymologies for certain initial segments: an impossible situation in the case of a genetic relationship; lack of common paradigmatic morphology; in many cases, there are ghosts, invented or polished meanings; and word-list linguistics rules supreme, as there are few if any references to texts or philology.

There are also many reconstructions proved to be totally false. For instance, regarding Korean, Starostin et al. state that Middle Korean genitive is  /nʲ/, while it actually was /s/ in its honorific form, and /ój/ or /uj/ as neutral forms.

In addition, some "cognates" are visibly forced, like the comparison between Turkish instrumental  and Japanese locative /ni/. A locative postposition expresses an absolutely different meaning to that of an instrumental, so it is evident that both of them are not related whatsoever. The same applies for Japanese /ga/ and Proto Tungusic /ga/. The first of those particles expresses genitive case, while the second is the partitive case, which bear no resemblance of meaning at all either. A different kind of issue is that of the Old Turkish genitive /Xŋ/ (where "X" stands for any phoneme) and Old Japanese genitive /no/. Although they share the same consonant, the fact that the former is a vowel plus a consonant, and the second is a fixed set of the consonant /n/ plus vowel /o/ makes the fact that those two are cognates extremely unlikely.

Selected cognates

Personal pronouns
The table below is taken (with slight modifications) from Blažek (2006) and transcribed into IPA.

As above, forms not attested in Classical Mongolian or Middle Korean but reconstructed for their ancestors are marked with an asterisk, and /V/ represents an uncertain vowel.

There are, however, several problems with this proposed list. Aside from the huge amount of non-attested, free reconstructions, some mistakes on the research carried out by Altaicists must be pointed out. The first of them is that Old Japanese for the first person pronoun ("I", in English) was neither /ba/ or /a/. It was /ware/ (和禮), and sometimes it was abbreviated to /wa/ (吾). Also, it is not a Sino-Japanese word, but a native Japanese term. In addition, the second person pronoun was not /si/, but either /imasi/ (汝), or /namu/ (奈牟), which sometimes was shortened to /na/. Its plural was /namu tachi/ (奈牟多知).

Other basic vocabulary
The following table is a brief selection of further proposed cognates in basic vocabulary across the Altaic family (from Starostin et al. [2003]). Their reconstructions and equivalences are not accepted by the mainstream linguists and therefore remain very controversial.

1 Contains the Proto-Altaic dual suffix : "both breasts" – "chest" – "heart".
2 Contains the Proto-Altaic singulative suffix -/nV/: "one breast".
3 Compare Baekje */turak/ "stone" (Blažek 2006).
4 This is in the Jurchen language. In modern Manchu it is usiha.
5 This is disputed by Georg (2004), who states: "The traditional Tungusological reconstruction *yāsa [ = ] cannot be replaced by the nasal-initial one espoused here, needed for the comparison." However, Starostin (2005) mentions evidence from several Tungusic languages cited by Starostin et al. (2003). Georg (2005) does not accept this, referring to Georg (1999/2000) and a then upcoming paper.

Numerals and related words
In the Indo-European family, the numerals are remarkably stable. This is a rather exceptional case; especially words for higher numbers are often borrowed wholesale. (Perhaps the most famous cases are Japanese and Korean, which have two complete sets of numerals each – one native, one Chinese.) Indeed, the Altaic numerals are less stable than the Indo-European ones, but nevertheless Starostin et al. (2003) reconstruct them as follows. They are not accepted by the mainstream linguists and are controversial. Other reconstructions show little to no similarities in numerals of the proto-languages.

1 Manchu /soni/ "single, odd".
2 Old Bulgarian /tvi-rem/ "second".
3 Kitan has  "2" (Blažek 2006).
4  is probably a contraction of -/ubu/-.
5 The /y/- of  "3" "may also reflect the same root, although the suffixation is not clear." (Starostin et al. 2003:223)
6 Compare Silla /mir/ "3" (Blažek 2006).
7 Compare Goguryeo /mir/ "3" (Blažek 2006).
8 "third (or next after three = fourth)", "consisting of three objects"
9 "song with three out of four verses rhyming (first, second and fourth)"
10 Kitan has  "4" (Blažek 2006).
11 Kitan has  "5" (Blažek 2006).
12 "(the prefixed i- is somewhat unclear: it is also used as a separate word meaning 'fifty', but the historical root here is no doubt *tu-)" (Starostin et al. 2003:223). – Blažek (2006) also considers Goguryeo  "5" (from ) to be related.
13 Kitan has  "6" (Blažek 2006).
14 Middle Korean has  "6", which may fit here, but the required loss of initial  "is not quite regular" (Starostin et al. 2003:224).
15 The Mongolian forms "may suggest an original proto-form"  or  "with dissimilation or metathesis in" Proto-Mongolic (Starostin et al. 2003:224). – Kitan has  "7".
16  in Early Middle Korean (タリクニ/チリクヒ in the ).
17 "Problematic" (Starostin et al. 2003:224).
18 Compare Goguryeo  "10" (Blažek 2006).
19 Manchu  "a very big number".
20 Orok  "a bundle of 10 squirrels", Nanai  "collection, gathering".
21 "Hundred" in names of hundreds.
22 Starostin et al. (2003) suspect this to be a reduplication:  "20 + 20".
23  would be expected; Starostin et al.
24 From .
25 Also see Tümen.
26 Modern Korean – needs further investigations

See also
Classification of the Japonic languages
Nostratic languages
Uralo-Siberian languages
Xiongnu
Pan-Turanism
Turco-Mongol 
Yeniseian languages
Etymological Dictionary of the Altaic Languages

References

Works cited 

 Aalto, Pentti. 1955. "On the Altaic initial *p-." Central Asiatic Journal 1, 9–16.
 Anonymous. 2008. [title missing]. Bulletin of the Society for the Study of the Indigenous Languages of the Americas, 31 March 2008, 264: .
 
 Anthony, David W. 2007. The Horse, the Wheel, and Language. Princeton: Princeton University Press.
Boller, Anton. 1857. Nachweis, daß das Japanische zum ural-altaischen Stamme gehört. Wien. 
 Clauson, Gerard. 1959. "The case for the Altaic theory examined." Akten des vierundzwanzigsten internationalen Orientalisten-Kongresses, edited by H. Franke. Wiesbaden: Deutsche Morgenländische Gesellschaft, in Komission bei Franz Steiner Verlag.
 Clauson, Gerard. 1968. "A lexicostatistical appraisal of the Altaic theory." Central Asiatic Journal 13: 1–23. 
 Doerfer, Gerhard. 1973. "Lautgesetze und Zufall: Betrachtungen zum Omnicomparativismus." Innsbrucker Beiträge zur Sprachwissenschaft 10.
 Doerfer, Gerhard. 1974. "Ist das Japanische mit den altaischen Sprachen verwandt?" Zeitschrift der Deutschen Morgenländischen Gesellschaft 114.1.
 Doerfer, Gerhard. 1985. Mongolica-Tungusica. Wiesbaden: Otto Harrassowitz. 
Georg, Stefan. 1999 / 2000. "Haupt und Glieder der altaischen Hypothese: die Körperteilbezeichnungen im Türkischen, Mongolischen und Tungusischen" ('Head and members of the Altaic hypothesis: The body-part designations in Turkic, Mongolic, and Tungusic'). Ural-altaische Jahrbücher, neue Folge B 16, 143–182. 
 Lee, Ki-Moon and S. Robert Ramsey. 2011. A History of the Korean Language. Cambridge: Cambridge University Press. 
Menges, Karl. H. 1975. Altajische Studien II. Japanisch und Altajisch. Wiesbaden: Franz Steiner Verlag. 
 Miller, Roy Andrew. 1980. Origins of the Japanese Language: Lectures in Japan during the Academic Year 1977–1978. Seattle: University of Washington Press. . 
 Ramstedt, G.J. 1952. Einführung in die altaische Sprachwissenschaft I. Lautlehre, 'Introduction to Altaic Linguistics, Volume 1: Phonology', edited and published by Pentti Aalto. Helsinki: Suomalais-Ugrilainen Seura.
 Ramstedt, G.J. 1957. Einführung in die altaische Sprachwissenschaft II. Formenlehre, 'Introduction to Altaic Linguistics, Volume 2: Morphology', edited and published by Pentti Aalto. Helsinki: Suomalais-Ugrilainen Seura.
 Ramstedt, G.J. 1966. Einführung in die altaische Sprachwissenschaft III. Register, 'Introduction to Altaic Linguistics, Volume 3: Index', edited and published by Pentti Aalto. Helsinki: Suomalais-Ugrilainen Seura.
 Robbeets, Martine. 2004. "Swadesh 100 on Japanese, Korean and Altaic." Tokyo University Linguistic Papers, TULIP 23, 99–118.
 Robbeets, Martine. 2005. Is Japanese related to Korean, Tungusic, Mongolic and Turkic? Wiesbaden: Otto Harrassowitz. 
 Strahlenberg, P.J.T. von. 1730. Das nord- und ostliche Theil von Europa und Asia.... Stockholm. (Reprint: 1975. Studia Uralo-Altaica. Szeged and Amsterdam.)
 Strahlenberg, P.J.T. von. 1738. Russia, Siberia and Great Tartary, an Historico-geographical Description of the North and Eastern Parts of Europe and Asia.... (Reprint: 1970. New York: Arno Press.) English translation of the previous. 
 Tekin, Talat. 1994. "Altaic languages." In The Encyclopedia of Language and Linguistics, Vol. 1, edited by R.E. Asher. Oxford and New York: Pergamon Press. 
 Vovin, Alexander. 1993. "About the phonetic value of the Middle Korean grapheme ᅀ." Bulletin of the School of Oriental and African Studies 56(2), 247–259.
 Vovin, Alexander. 1994. "Genetic affiliation of Japanese and methodology of linguistic comparison." Journal de la Société finno-ougrienne 85, 241–256.
 Vovin, Alexander. 2001. "Japanese, Korean, and Tungusic: evidence for genetic relationship from verbal morphology." Altaic Affinities (Proceedings of the 40th Meeting of PIAC, Provo, Utah, 1997), edited by David B. Honey and David C. Wright, 83–202. Indiana University, Research Institute for Inner Asian Studies. 
 Vovin, Alexander. 2010. Koreo-Japonica: A Re-Evaluation of a Common Genetic Origin. University of Hawaii Press.
 Whitney Coolidge, Jennifer. 2005. Southern Turkmenistan in the Neolithic: A Petrographic Case Study. Oxbow Books.

Further reading 
 Greenberg, Joseph H. 1997. "Does Altaic exist?" In Irén Hegedus, Peter A. Michalove, and Alexis Manaster Ramer (editors), Indo-European, Nostratic and Beyond: A Festschrift for Vitaly V. Shevoroshkin, Washington, DC: Institute for the Study of Man, 1997, 88–93. (Reprinted in Joseph H. Greenberg, Genetic Linguistics, Oxford: Oxford University Press, 2005, 325–330.)
 Hahn, Reinhard F. 1994. LINGUIST List 5.908, 18 August 1994. 
 Janhune, Juha. 1995. "Prolegomena to a Comparative Analysis of Mongolic and Tungusic". Proceedings of the 38th Permanent International Altaistic Conference (PIAC), 209–218. Wiesbaden: Harrassowitz.
 Johanson, Lars. 1999. "Cognates and copies in Altaic verb derivation." Language and Literature – Japanese and the Other Altaic Languages: Studies in Honour of Roy Andrew Miller on His 75th Birthday, edited by Karl H. Menges and Nelly Naumann, 1–13. Wiesbaden: Otto Harrassowitz. (Also: HTML version.)
 Johanson, Lars. 1999. "Attractiveness and relatedness: Notes on Turkic language contacts." Proceedings of the Twenty-Fifth Annual Meeting of the Berkeley Linguistics Society: Special Session on Caucasian, Dravidian, and Turkic Linguistics, edited by Jeff Good and Alan C.L. Yu, 87–94. Berkeley: Berkeley Linguistics Society.
 Johanson, Lars. 2002. Structural Factors in Turkic Language Contacts, translated by Vanessa Karam. Richmond, Surrey: Curzon Press.
 Kortlandt, Frederik. 1993. "The origin of the Japanese and Korean accent systems." Acta Linguistica Hafniensia 26, 57–65.
 Martin, Samuel E. 1966. "Lexical evidence relating Korean to Japanese." Language 12.2, 185–251.
 Nichols, Johanna. 1992. Linguistic Diversity in Space and Time. Chicago: University of Chicago Press.
 Robbeets, Martine. 2004. "Belief or argument? The classification of the Japanese language." Eurasia Newsletter 8. Graduate School of Letters, Kyoto University. 
 Ruhlen, Merritt. 1987. A Guide to the World's Languages. Stanford University Press.
 Sinor, Denis. 1990. Essays in Comparative Altaic Linguistics. Bloomington: Indiana University, Research Institute for Inner Asian Studies. .
 Vovin, Alexander. 2009. Japanese, Korean, and other 'non-Altaic' languages. Central Asiatic Journal 53 (1): 105–147.